HMS Oberon was the lead ship of the Oberon-class submarines, operated by the Royal Navy.

Design and construction

The Oberon class was a direct follow on of the Porpoise-class, with the same dimensions and external design, but updates to equipment and internal fittings, and a higher grade of steel used for fabrication of the pressure hull.

Displacement was 1,610 tons standard, 2,030 tons full load when surfaced, and 2,410 tons full load when submerged. Propulsion machinery consisted of 2 Admiralty Standard Range 16 VMS diesel generators, and two  electric motors, each driving a  3-bladed propeller at up to 400 rpm. Eight  diameter torpedo tubes were fitted (six facing forward, two aft), with a total payload of 24 torpedoes. The boats were fitted with Type 186 and Type 187 sonars, and an I-band surface search radar. The standard complement was 68: 6 officers, 62 sailors.

Oberon was laid down by Chatham Dockyard on 28 November 1957, and launched on 18 July 1959. She was commissioned into the Royal Navy on 24 February 1961. Oberon cost £2.43 million. She was the first of the class to have a deeper casing installed to house the equipment for initial training of SSN crews.

Operational history
Ran aground in Rothesay Bay - early 1960s - soon refloated.

Decommissioning and fate
Oberon was paid off in 1986. She was sold in 1987 to the Seaforth Group to be refitted for resale to Egypt, but was broken up at Grimsby in 1991.

References

 

 

Oberon-class submarines of the Royal Navy
Ships built in Chatham
1959 ships
Cold War submarines of the United Kingdom
Maritime incidents in 1961